Tanejemet of Tanedjemy is a King's daughter and King's Wife from the New Kingdom. She is possibly a daughter of Ramesses I and wife of Seti I.

Biography
Queen Tanedjemet's tomb in the Valley of the Queens was described by Lepsius in the Denkmäler.

Her identity has been up for debate. In Porter and Moss (1964) it is even suggested that this queen dates to the 20th Dynasty. Troy (1986) suggested Tanedjemet was a daughter-wife of Ramesses II. Later, Leblanc (1999) has suggested that she is a wife of Sety I.

Hari (1965) and Thomas (1967) had conjectured that the 'Ta' element of the name should be read as 'Mut', thereby rendering the name of the queen as Mutnedjmet. This reading and the associated suggestion that this was the tomb of Horemheb's wife is no longer accepted.

Tomb QV33
Tomb QV33 in the Valley of the Queens was described by Lepsius. The tomb is listed as tomb number 14. Queen Tanedjemet  holds the title King's Daughter and is said to be a Mistress of the Two Lands. She is depicted with the vulture cap usually associated with queens. The tomb is in a bad condition. Not much of the original decoration remains.

The tomb was likely robbed at the end of the 20th Dynasty, and reused during the 26th Dynasty. A large amount of glasswork and other materials dating to this period were found in the tomb. During the Roman Period a large number of mummies was interred in the tomb. These burials are thought to date to the 2nd and 3rd century A.D.

References

Buildings and structures completed in the 13th century BC
Valley of the Queens
13th-century BC deaths
Queens consort of the Nineteenth Dynasty of Egypt